Altona Municipal Airport  is located  southeast of Altona, Manitoba, Canada.

References

Registered aerodromes in Manitoba